

People
 Sebastiano Lo Monaco (1730–1775), Italian painter
 Sebastiano Lo Monaco (born 1958), Italian actor of theatre, cinema and television